Evolutionary psychology is a theoretical approach in psychology that examines cognition and behavior from a modern evolutionary perspective. It seeks to identify human psychological adaptations with regards to the ancestral problems they evolved to solve. In this framework, psychological traits and mechanisms are either functional products of natural and sexual selection or non-adaptive by-products of other adaptive traits. 

Adaptationist thinking about physiological mechanisms, such as the heart, lungs, and the liver, is common in evolutionary biology. Evolutionary psychologists apply the same thinking in psychology, arguing that just as the heart evolved to pump blood, and the liver evolved to detoxify poisons, there is modularity of mind in that different psychological mechanisms evolved to solve different adaptive problems. These evolutionary psychologists argue that much of human behavior is the output of psychological adaptations that evolved to solve recurrent problems in human ancestral environments.

Some evolutionary psychologists argue that evolutionary theory can provide a foundational, metatheoretical framework that integrates the entire field of psychology in the same way evolutionary biology has for biology.

Evolutionary psychologists hold that behaviors or traits that occur universally in all cultures are good candidates for evolutionary adaptations, including the abilities to infer others' emotions, discern kin from non-kin, identify and prefer healthier mates, and cooperate with others. Findings have been made regarding human social behaviour related to infanticide, intelligence, marriage patterns, promiscuity, perception of beauty, bride price, and parental investment. The theories and findings of evolutionary psychology have applications in many fields, including economics, environment, health, law, management, psychiatry, politics, and literature.

Criticism of evolutionary psychology involves questions of testability, cognitive and evolutionary assumptions (such as modular functioning of the brain, and large uncertainty about the ancestral environment), importance of non-genetic and non-adaptive explanations, as well as political and ethical issues due to interpretations of research results. Evolutionary psychologists frequently engage with and respond to such criticisms.

Scope

Principles
Evolutionary psychology is an approach that views human nature as the product of a universal set of evolved psychological adaptations to recurring problems in the ancestral environment. Proponents suggest that it seeks to integrate psychology into the other natural sciences, rooting it in the organizing theory of biology (evolutionary theory), and thus understanding psychology as a branch of biology. Anthropologist John Tooby and psychologist Leda Cosmides note:

Just as human physiology and evolutionary physiology have worked to identify physical adaptations of the body that represent "human physiological nature," the purpose of evolutionary psychology is to identify evolved emotional and cognitive adaptations that represent "human psychological nature." According to Steven Pinker, it is "not a single theory but a large set of hypotheses" and a term that "has also come to refer to a particular way of applying evolutionary theory to the mind, with an emphasis on adaptation, gene-level selection, and modularity." Evolutionary psychology adopts an understanding of the mind that is based on the computational theory of mind. It describes mental processes as computational operations, so that, for example, a fear response is described as arising from a neurological computation that inputs the perceptional data, e.g. a visual image of a spider, and outputs the appropriate reaction, e.g. fear of possibly dangerous animals. Under this view, any domain-general learning is impossible because of the combinatorial explosion. Evolutionary Psychology specifies the domain as the problems of survival and reproduction.

While philosophers have generally considered the human mind to include broad faculties, such as reason and lust, evolutionary psychologists describe evolved psychological mechanisms as narrowly focused to deal with specific issues, such as catching cheaters or choosing mates. The discipline views the human brain as comprising many functional mechanisms called psychological adaptations or evolved cognitive mechanisms or cognitive modules, designed by the process of natural selection. Examples include language-acquisition modules, incest-avoidance mechanisms, cheater-detection mechanisms, intelligence and sex-specific mating preferences, foraging mechanisms, alliance-tracking mechanisms, agent-detection mechanisms, and others. Some mechanisms, termed domain-specific, deal with recurrent adaptive problems over the course of human evolutionary history. Domain-general mechanisms, on the other hand, are proposed to deal with evolutionary novelty.

Evolutionary psychology has roots in cognitive psychology and evolutionary biology but also draws on behavioral ecology, artificial intelligence, genetics, ethology, anthropology, archaeology, biology, and zoology. It is closely linked to sociobiology, but there are key differences between them including the emphasis on domain-specific rather than domain-general mechanisms, the relevance of measures of current fitness, the importance of mismatch theory, and psychology rather than behavior.

Nikolaas Tinbergen's four categories of questions can help to clarify the distinctions between several different, but complementary, types of explanations. Evolutionary psychology focuses primarily on the "why?" questions, while traditional psychology focuses on the "how?" questions.

Premises
Evolutionary psychology is founded on several core premises.

 The brain is an information processing device, and it produces behavior in response to external and internal inputs.
 The brain's adaptive mechanisms were shaped by natural and sexual selection.
 Different neural mechanisms are specialized for solving problems in humanity's evolutionary past.
 The brain has evolved specialized neural mechanisms that were designed for solving problems that recurred over deep evolutionary time, giving modern humans stone-age minds.
 Most contents and processes of the brain are unconscious; and most mental problems that seem easy to solve are actually extremely difficult problems that are solved unconsciously by complicated neural mechanisms.
 Human psychology consists of many specialized mechanisms, each sensitive to different classes of information or inputs. These mechanisms combine to produce manifest behavior.

History

Evolutionary psychology has its historical roots in Charles Darwin's theory of natural selection. In The Origin of Species, Darwin predicted that psychology would develop an evolutionary basis:

Two of his later books were devoted to the study of animal emotions and psychology; The Descent of Man, and Selection in Relation to Sex in 1871 and The Expression of the Emotions in Man and Animals in 1872. Darwin's work inspired William James's functionalist approach to psychology. Darwin's theories of evolution, adaptation, and natural selection have provided insight into why brains function the way they do.

The content of evolutionary psychology has derived from, on the one hand, the biological sciences (especially evolutionary theory as it relates to ancient human environments, the study of paleoanthropology and animal behavior) and, on the other, the human sciences, especially psychology.

Evolutionary biology as an academic discipline emerged with the modern synthesis in the 1930s and 1940s. In the 1930s the study of animal behavior (ethology) emerged with the work of the Dutch biologist Nikolaas Tinbergen and the Austrian biologists Konrad Lorenz and Karl von Frisch.

W.D. Hamilton's (1964) papers on inclusive fitness and Robert Trivers's (1972) theories on reciprocity and parental investment helped to establish evolutionary thinking in psychology and the other social sciences. In 1975, Edward O. Wilson combined evolutionary theory with studies of animal and social behavior, building on the works of Lorenz and Tinbergen, in his book Sociobiology: The New Synthesis.

In the 1970s, two major branches developed from ethology. Firstly, the study of animal social behavior (including humans) generated sociobiology, defined by its pre-eminent proponent Edward O. Wilson in 1975 as "the systematic study of the biological basis of all social behavior" and in 1978 as "the extension of population biology and evolutionary theory to social organization." Secondly, there was behavioral ecology which placed less emphasis on social behavior; it focused on the ecological and evolutionary basis of animal and human behavior.

In the 1970s and 1980s university departments began to include the term evolutionary biology in their titles. The modern era of evolutionary psychology was ushered in, in particular, by Donald Symons' 1979 book The Evolution of Human Sexuality and Leda Cosmides and John Tooby's 1992 book The Adapted Mind. David Buller observed that the term "evolutionary psychology" is sometimes seen as denoting research based on the specific methodological and theoretical commitments of certain researchers from the Santa Barbara school (University of California), thus some evolutionary psychologists prefer to term their work "human ecology", "human behavioural ecology" or "evolutionary anthropology" instead.

From psychology there are the primary streams of developmental, social and cognitive psychology. Establishing some measure of the relative influence of genetics and environment on behavior has been at the core of behavioral genetics and its variants, notably studies at the molecular level that examine the relationship between genes, neurotransmitters and behavior. Dual inheritance theory (DIT), developed in the late 1970s and early 1980s, has a slightly different perspective by trying to explain how human behavior is a product of two different and interacting evolutionary processes: genetic evolution and cultural evolution. DIT is seen by some as a "middle-ground" between views that emphasize human universals versus those that emphasize cultural variation.

Theoretical foundations

The theories on which evolutionary psychology is based originated with Charles Darwin's work, including his speculations about the evolutionary origins of social instincts in humans. Modern evolutionary psychology, however, is possible only because of advances in evolutionary theory in the 20th century.

Evolutionary psychologists say that natural selection has provided humans with many psychological adaptations, in much the same way that it generated humans' anatomical and physiological adaptations. As with adaptations in general, psychological adaptations are said to be specialized for the environment in which an organism evolved, the environment of evolutionary adaptedness. Sexual selection provides organisms with adaptations related to mating. For male mammals, which have a relatively high maximal potential reproduction rate, sexual selection leads to adaptations that help them compete for females. For female mammals, with a relatively low maximal potential reproduction rate, sexual selection leads to choosiness, which helps females select higher quality mates. Charles Darwin described both natural selection and sexual selection, and he relied on group selection to explain the evolution of altruistic (self-sacrificing) behavior. But group selection was considered a weak explanation, because in any group the less altruistic individuals will be more likely to survive, and the group will become less self-sacrificing as a whole.

In 1964, the evolutionary biologist William D. Hamilton proposed inclusive fitness theory, emphasizing a gene-centered view of evolution. Hamilton noted that genes can increase the replication of copies of themselves into the next generation by influencing the organism's social traits in such a way that (statistically) results in helping the survival and reproduction of other copies of the same genes (most simply, identical copies in the organism's close relatives). According to Hamilton's rule, self-sacrificing behaviors (and the genes influencing them) can evolve if they typically help the organism's close relatives so much that it more than compensates for the individual animal's sacrifice. Inclusive fitness theory resolved the issue of how altruism can evolve. Other theories also help explain the evolution of altruistic behavior, including evolutionary game theory, tit-for-tat reciprocity, and generalized reciprocity. These theories help to explain the development of altruistic behavior, and account for hostility toward cheaters (individuals that take advantage of others' altruism).

Several mid-level evolutionary theories inform evolutionary psychology. The r/K selection theory proposes that some species prosper by having many offspring, while others follow the strategy of having fewer offspring but investing much more in each one. Humans follow the second strategy. Parental investment theory explains how parents invest more or less in individual offspring based on how successful those offspring are likely to be, and thus how much they might improve the parents' inclusive fitness. According to the Trivers–Willard hypothesis, parents in good conditions tend to invest more in sons (who are best able to take advantage of good conditions), while parents in poor conditions tend to invest more in daughters (who are best able to have successful offspring even in poor conditions). According to life history theory, animals evolve life histories to match their environments, determining details such as age at first reproduction and number of offspring. Dual inheritance theory posits that genes and human culture have interacted, with genes affecting the development of culture, and culture, in turn, affecting human evolution on a genetic level, in a similar way to the Baldwin effect.

Evolved psychological mechanisms

Evolutionary psychology is based on the hypothesis that, just like hearts, lungs, livers, kidneys, and immune systems, cognition has a functional structure that has a genetic basis, and therefore has evolved by natural selection. Like other organs and tissues, this functional structure should be universally shared amongst a species and should solve important problems of survival and reproduction.

Evolutionary psychologists seek to understand psychological mechanisms by understanding the survival and reproductive functions they might have served over the course of evolutionary history. These might include abilities to infer others' emotions, discern kin from non-kin, identify and prefer healthier mates, cooperate with others and follow leaders. Consistent with the theory of natural selection, evolutionary psychology sees humans as often in conflict with others, including mates and relatives. For instance, a mother may wish to wean her offspring from breastfeeding earlier than does her infant, which frees up the mother to invest in additional offspring. Evolutionary psychology also recognizes the role of kin selection and reciprocity in evolving prosocial traits such as altruism. Like chimpanzees and bonobos, humans have subtle and flexible social instincts, allowing them to form extended families, lifelong friendships, and political alliances. In studies testing theoretical predictions, evolutionary psychologists have made modest findings on topics such as infanticide, intelligence, marriage patterns, promiscuity, perception of beauty, bride price and parental investment.

Another example would be the evolved mechanism in depression. Clinical depression is maladaptive and should have evolutionary approaches so it can become adaptive. Over the centuries animals and humans have gone through hard times to stay alive, which made our fight or flight senses evolve tremendously. For instances, mammalians have separation anxiety from their guardians which causes distress and sends signals to their hypothalamic pituitary adrenal axis, and emotional/behavioral changes. Going through these types of circumstances helps mammals cope with separation anxiety.

Historical topics
Proponents of evolutionary psychology in the 1990s made some explorations in historical events, but the response from historical experts was highly negative and there has been little effort to continue that line of research. Historian Lynn Hunt says that the historians complained that the researchers:

Hunt states that "the few attempts to build up a subfield of psychohistory collapsed under the weight of its presuppositions." She concludes that as of 2014 the "'iron curtain' between historians and psychology...remains standing."

Products of evolution: adaptations, exaptations, byproducts, and random variation
Not all traits of organisms are evolutionary adaptations. As noted in the table below, traits may also be exaptations, byproducts of adaptations (sometimes called "spandrels"), or random variation between individuals.

Psychological adaptations are hypothesized to be innate or relatively easy to learn and to manifest in cultures worldwide. For example, the ability of toddlers to learn a language with virtually no training is likely to be a psychological adaptation. On the other hand, ancestral humans did not read or write, thus today, learning to read and write requires extensive training, and presumably involves the repurposing of cognitive capacities that evolved in response to selection pressures unrelated to written language. However, variations in manifest behavior can result from universal mechanisms interacting with different local environments. For example, Caucasians who move from a northern climate to the equator will have darker skin. The mechanisms regulating their pigmentation do not change; rather the input to those mechanisms change, resulting in different outputs.

One of the tasks of evolutionary psychology is to identify which psychological traits are likely to be adaptations, byproducts or random variation. George C. Williams suggested that an "adaptation is a special and onerous concept that should only be used where it is really necessary." As noted by Williams and others, adaptations can be identified by their improbable complexity, species universality, and adaptive functionality.

Obligate and facultative adaptations
A question that may be asked about an adaptation is whether it is generally obligate (relatively robust in the face of typical environmental variation) or facultative (sensitive to typical environmental variation). The sweet taste of sugar and the pain of hitting one's knee against concrete are the result of fairly obligate psychological adaptations; typical environmental variability during development does not much affect their operation. By contrast, facultative adaptations are somewhat like "if-then" statements. For example,  The adaptation for skin to tan is conditional to exposure to sunlight; this is an example of another facultative adaptation. When a psychological adaptation is facultative, evolutionary psychologists concern themselves with how developmental and environmental inputs influence the expression of the adaptation.

Cultural universals

Evolutionary psychologists hold that behaviors or traits that occur universally in all cultures are good candidates for evolutionary adaptations. Cultural universals include behaviors related to language, cognition, social roles, gender roles, and technology. Evolved psychological adaptations (such as the ability to learn a language) interact with cultural inputs to produce specific behaviors (e.g., the specific language learned).

Basic gender differences, such as greater eagerness for sex among men and greater coyness among women, are explained as sexually dimorphic psychological adaptations that reflect the different reproductive strategies of males and females.

Evolutionary psychologists contrast their approach to what they term the "standard social science model," according to which the mind is a general-purpose cognition device shaped almost entirely by culture.

Environment of evolutionary adaptedness

Evolutionary psychology argues that to properly understand the functions of the brain, one must understand the properties of the environment in which the brain evolved. That environment is often referred to as the "environment of evolutionary adaptedness".

The idea of an environment of evolutionary adaptedness was first explored as a part of attachment theory by John Bowlby. This is the environment to which a particular evolved mechanism is adapted. More specifically, the environment of evolutionary adaptedness is defined as the set of historically recurring selection pressures that formed a given adaptation, as well as those aspects of the environment that were necessary for the proper development and functioning of the adaptation.

Humans, comprising the genus Homo, appeared between 1.5 and 2.5 million years ago, a time that roughly coincides with the start of the Pleistocene 2.6 million years ago. Because the Pleistocene ended a mere 12,000 years ago, most human adaptations either newly evolved during the Pleistocene, or were maintained by stabilizing selection during the Pleistocene. Evolutionary psychology, therefore, proposes that the majority of human psychological mechanisms are adapted to reproductive problems frequently encountered in Pleistocene environments. In broad terms, these problems include those of growth, development, differentiation, maintenance, mating, parenting, and social relationships.

The environment of evolutionary adaptedness is significantly different from modern society. The ancestors of modern humans lived in smaller groups, had more cohesive cultures, and had more stable and rich contexts for identity and meaning. Researchers look to existing hunter-gatherer societies for clues as to how hunter-gatherers lived in the environment of evolutionary adaptedness. Unfortunately, the few surviving hunter-gatherer societies are different from each other, and they have been pushed out of the best land and into harsh environments, so it is not clear how closely they reflect ancestral culture. However, all around the world small-band hunter-gatherers offer a similar developmental system for the young ("hunter-gatherer childhood model," Konner, 2005; 
"evolved developmental niche" or "evolved nest;" Narvaez et al., 2013). The characteristics of the niche are largely the same as for social mammals, who evolved over 30 million years ago: soothing perinatal experience, several years of on-request breastfeeding, nearly constant affection or physical proximity, responsiveness to need (mitigating offspring distress), self-directed play, and for humans, multiple responsive caregivers. Initial studies show the importance of these components in early life for positive child outcomes.

Evolutionary psychologists sometimes look to chimpanzees, bonobos, and other great apes for insight into human ancestral behavior.

Mismatches

Since an organism's adaptations were suited to its ancestral environment, a new and different environment can create a mismatch. Because humans are mostly adapted to Pleistocene environments, psychological mechanisms sometimes exhibit "mismatches" to the modern environment. One example is the fact that although about 10,000 people are killed with guns in the US annually, whereas spiders and snakes kill only a handful, people nonetheless learn to fear spiders and snakes about as easily as they do a pointed gun, and more easily than an unpointed gun, rabbits or flowers. A potential explanation is that spiders and snakes were a threat to human ancestors throughout the Pleistocene, whereas guns (and rabbits and flowers) were not. There is thus a mismatch between humans' evolved fear-learning psychology and the modern environment.

This mismatch also shows up in the phenomena of the supernormal stimulus, a stimulus that elicits a response more strongly than the stimulus for which the response evolved. The term was coined by Niko Tinbergen to refer to non-human animal behavior, but psychologist Deirdre Barrett said that supernormal stimulation governs the behavior of humans as powerfully as that of other animals. She explained junk food as an exaggerated stimulus to cravings for salt, sugar, and fats, and she says that television is an exaggeration of social cues of laughter, smiling faces and attention-grabbing action. Magazine centerfolds and double cheeseburgers pull instincts intended for an environment of evolutionary adaptedness where breast development was a sign of health, youth and fertility in a prospective mate, and fat was a rare and vital nutrient. The psychologist Mark van Vugt recently argued that modern organizational leadership is a mismatch. His argument is that humans are not adapted to work in large, anonymous bureaucratic structures with formal hierarchies. The human mind still responds to personalized, charismatic leadership primarily in the context of informal, egalitarian settings. Hence the dissatisfaction and alienation that many employees experience. Salaries, bonuses and other privileges exploit instincts for relative status, which attract particularly males to senior executive positions.

Research methods
Evolutionary theory is heuristic in that it may generate hypotheses that might not be developed from other theoretical approaches. One of the major goals of adaptationist research is to identify which organismic traits are likely to be adaptations, and which are byproducts or random variations. As noted earlier, adaptations are expected to show evidence of complexity, functionality, and species universality, while byproducts or random variation will not. In addition, adaptations are expected to manifest as proximate mechanisms that interact with the environment in either a generally obligate or facultative fashion (see above). Evolutionary psychologists are also interested in identifying these proximate mechanisms (sometimes termed "mental mechanisms" or "psychological adaptations") and what type of information they take as input, how they process that information, and their outputs. Evolutionary developmental psychology, or "evo-devo," focuses on how adaptations may be activated at certain developmental times (e.g., losing baby teeth, adolescence, etc.) or how events during the development of an individual may alter life-history trajectories.

Evolutionary psychologists use several strategies to develop and test hypotheses about whether a psychological trait is likely to be an evolved adaptation. Buss (2011) notes that these methods include:

Evolutionary psychologists also use various sources of data for testing, including experiments, archaeological records, data from hunter-gatherer societies, observational studies, neuroscience data, self-reports and surveys, public records, and human products.
Recently, additional methods and tools have been introduced based on fictional scenarios, mathematical models, and multi-agent computer simulations.

Main areas of research
Foundational areas of research in evolutionary psychology can be divided into broad categories of adaptive problems that arise from evolutionary theory itself: survival, mating, parenting, family and kinship, interactions with non-kin, and cultural evolution.

Survival and individual-level psychological adaptations
Problems of survival are clear targets for the evolution of physical and psychological adaptations. Major problems the ancestors of present-day humans faced included food selection and acquisition; territory selection and physical shelter; and avoiding predators and other environmental threats.

Consciousness

Consciousness meets George Williams' criteria of species universality, complexity, and functionality, and it is a trait that apparently increases fitness.

In his paper "Evolution of consciousness," John Eccles argues that special anatomical and physical adaptations of the mammalian cerebral cortex gave rise to consciousness. In contrast, others have argued that the recursive circuitry underwriting consciousness is much more primitive, having evolved initially in pre-mammalian species because it improves the capacity for interaction with both social and natural environments by providing an energy-saving "neutral" gear in an otherwise energy-expensive motor output machine. Once in place, this recursive circuitry may well have provided a basis for the subsequent development of many of the functions that consciousness facilitates in higher organisms, as outlined by Bernard J. Baars. Richard Dawkins suggested that humans evolved consciousness in order to make themselves the subjects of thought. Daniel Povinelli suggests that large, tree-climbing apes evolved consciousness to take into account one's own mass when moving safely among tree branches. Consistent with this hypothesis, Gordon Gallup found that chimpanzees and orangutans, but not little monkeys or terrestrial gorillas, demonstrated self-awareness in mirror tests.

The concept of consciousness can refer to voluntary action, awareness, or wakefulness. However, even voluntary behavior involves unconscious mechanisms. Many cognitive processes take place in the cognitive unconscious, unavailable to conscious awareness. Some behaviors are conscious when learned but then become unconscious, seemingly automatic. Learning, especially implicitly learning a skill, can take place outside of consciousness. For example, plenty of people know how to turn right when they ride a bike, but very few can accurately explain how they actually do so. Evolutionary psychology approaches self-deception as an adaptation that can improve one's results in social exchanges.

Sleep may have evolved to conserve energy when activity would be less fruitful or more dangerous, such as at night, and especially during the winter season.

Sensation and perception

Many experts, such as Jerry Fodor, write that the purpose of perception is knowledge, but evolutionary psychologists hold that its primary purpose is to guide action. For example, they say, depth perception seems to have evolved not to help us know the distances to other objects but rather to help us move around in space. Evolutionary psychologists say that animals from fiddler crabs to humans use eyesight for collision avoidance, suggesting that vision is basically for directing action, not providing knowledge.

Building and maintaining sense organs is metabolically expensive, so these organs evolve only when they improve an organism's fitness. More than half the brain is devoted to processing sensory information, and the brain itself consumes roughly one-fourth of one's metabolic resources, so the senses must provide exceptional benefits to fitness. Perception accurately mirrors the world; animals get useful, accurate information through their senses.

Scientists who study perception and sensation have long understood the human senses as adaptations to their surrounding worlds. Depth perception consists of processing over half a dozen visual cues, each of which is based on a regularity of the physical world. Vision evolved to respond to the narrow range of electromagnetic energy that is plentiful and that does not pass through objects. Sound waves go around corners and interact with obstacles, creating a complex pattern that includes useful information about the sources of and distances to objects. Larger animals naturally make lower-pitched sounds as a consequence of their size. The range over which an animal hears, on the other hand, is determined by adaptation. Homing pigeons, for example, can hear the very low-pitched sound (infrasound) that carries great distances, even though most smaller animals detect higher-pitched sounds. Taste and smell respond to chemicals in the environment that are thought to have been significant for fitness in the environment of evolutionary adaptedness. For example, salt and sugar were apparently both valuable to the human or pre-human inhabitants of the environment of evolutionary adaptedness, so present-day humans have an intrinsic hunger for salty and sweet tastes. The sense of touch is actually many senses, including pressure, heat, cold, tickle, and pain. Pain, while unpleasant, is adaptive. An important adaptation for senses is range shifting, by which the organism becomes temporarily more or less sensitive to sensation. For example, one's eyes automatically adjust to dim or bright ambient light. Sensory abilities of different organisms often coevolve, as is the case with the hearing of echolocating bats and that of the moths that have evolved to respond to the sounds that the bats make.

Evolutionary psychologists contend that perception demonstrates the principle of modularity, with specialized mechanisms handling particular perception tasks. For example, people with damage to a particular part of the brain have the specific defect of not being able to recognize faces (prosopagnosia). Evolutionary psychology suggests that this indicates a so-called face-reading module.

Learning and facultative adaptations
In evolutionary psychology, learning is said to be accomplished through evolved capacities, specifically facultative adaptations. Facultative adaptations express themselves differently depending on input from the environment. Sometimes the input comes during development and helps shape that development. For example, migrating birds learn to orient themselves by the stars during a critical period in their maturation. Evolutionary psychologists believe that humans also learn language along an evolved program, also with critical periods. The input can also come during daily tasks, helping the organism cope with changing environmental conditions. For example, animals evolved Pavlovian conditioning in order to solve problems about causal relationships. Animals accomplish learning tasks most easily when those tasks resemble problems that they faced in their evolutionary past, such as a rat learning where to find food or water. Learning capacities sometimes demonstrate differences between the sexes. In many animal species, for example, males can solve spatial problems faster and more accurately than females, due to the effects of male hormones during development. The same might be true of humans.

Emotion and motivation

Motivations direct and energize behavior, while emotions provide the affective component to motivation, positive or negative. In the early 1970s, Paul Ekman and colleagues began a line of research which suggests that many emotions are universal. He found evidence that humans share at least five basic emotions: fear, sadness, happiness, anger, and disgust. Social emotions evidently evolved to motivate social behaviors that were adaptive in the environment of evolutionary adaptedness. For example, spite seems to work against the individual but it can establish an individual's reputation as someone to be feared. Shame and pride can motivate behaviors that help one maintain one's standing in a community, and self-esteem is one's estimate of one's status.
Motivation has a neurobiological basis in the reward system of the brain. Recently, it has been suggested that reward systems may evolve in such a way that there may be an inherent or unavoidable trade-off in the motivational system for activities of short versus long duration.

Cognition
Cognition refers to internal representations of the world and internal information processing. From an evolutionary psychology perspective, cognition is not "general purpose," but uses heuristics, or strategies, that generally increase the likelihood of solving problems that the ancestors of present-day humans routinely faced. For example, present-day humans are far more likely to solve logic problems that involve detecting cheating (a common problem given humans' social nature) than the same logic problem put in purely abstract terms. Since the ancestors of present-day humans did not encounter truly random events, present-day humans may be cognitively predisposed to incorrectly identify patterns in random sequences. "Gamblers' Fallacy" is one example of this. Gamblers may falsely believe that they have hit a "lucky streak" even when each outcome is actually random and independent of previous trials. Most people believe that if a fair coin has been flipped 9 times and Heads appears each time, that on the tenth flip, there is a greater than 50% chance of getting Tails. Humans find it far easier to make diagnoses or predictions using frequency data than when the same information is presented as probabilities or percentages, presumably because the ancestors of present-day humans lived in relatively small tribes (usually with fewer than 150 people) where frequency information was more readily available.

Personality
Evolutionary psychology is primarily interested in finding commonalities between people, or basic human psychological nature. From an evolutionary perspective, the fact that people have fundamental differences in personality traits initially presents something of a puzzle. (Note: The field of behavioral genetics is concerned with statistically partitioning differences between people into genetic and environmental sources of variance. However, understanding the concept of heritability can be tricky – heritability refers only to the differences between people, never the degree to which the traits of an individual are due to environmental or genetic factors, since traits are always a complex interweaving of both.)

Personality traits are conceptualized by evolutionary psychologists as due to normal variation around an optimum, due to frequency-dependent selection (behavioral polymorphisms), or as facultative adaptations. Like variability in height, some personality traits may simply reflect inter-individual variability around a general optimum. Or, personality traits may represent different genetically predisposed "behavioral morphs" – alternate behavioral strategies that depend on the frequency of competing behavioral strategies in the population. For example, if most of the population is generally trusting and gullible, the behavioral morph of being a "cheater" (or, in the extreme case, a sociopath) may be advantageous. Finally, like many other psychological adaptations, personality traits may be facultative – sensitive to typical variations in the social environment, especially during early development. For example, later-born children are more likely than firstborns to be rebellious, less conscientious and more open to new experiences, which may be advantageous to them given their particular niche in family structure. It is important to note that shared environmental influences do play a role in personality and are not always of less importance than genetic factors. However, shared environmental influences often decrease to near zero after adolescence but do not completely disappear.

Language

According to Steven Pinker, who builds on the work by Noam Chomsky, the universal human ability to learn to talk between the ages of 1 – 4, basically without training, suggests that language acquisition is a distinctly human psychological adaptation (see, in particular, Pinker's The Language Instinct). Pinker and Bloom (1990) argue that language as a mental faculty shares many likenesses with the complex organs of the body which suggests that, like these organs, language has evolved as an adaptation, since this is the only known mechanism by which such complex organs can develop.

Pinker follows Chomsky in arguing that the fact that children can learn any human language with no explicit instruction suggests that language, including most of grammar, is basically innate and that it only needs to be activated by interaction. Chomsky himself does not believe language to have evolved as an adaptation, but suggests that it likely evolved as a byproduct of some other adaptation, a so-called spandrel. But Pinker and Bloom argue that the organic nature of language strongly suggests that it has an adaptational origin.

Evolutionary psychologists hold that the FOXP2 gene may well be associated with the evolution of human language. In the 1980s, psycholinguist Myrna Gopnik identified a dominant gene that causes language impairment in the KE family of Britain. This gene turned out to be a mutation of the FOXP2 gene. Humans have a unique allele of this gene, which has otherwise been closely conserved through most of mammalian evolutionary history. This unique allele seems to have first appeared between 100 and 200 thousand years ago, and it is now all but universal in humans. However, the once-popular idea that FOXP2 is a 'grammar gene' or that it triggered the emergence of language in Homo sapiens is now widely discredited.

Currently, several competing theories about the evolutionary origin of language coexist, none of them having achieved a general consensus. Researchers of language acquisition in primates and humans such as Michael Tomasello and Talmy Givón, argue that the innatist framework has understated the role of imitation in learning and that it is not at all necessary to posit the existence of an innate grammar module to explain human language acquisition. Tomasello argues that studies of how children and primates actually acquire communicative skills suggest that humans learn complex behavior through experience, so that instead of a module specifically dedicated to language acquisition, language is acquired by the same cognitive mechanisms that are used to acquire all other kinds of socially transmitted behavior.

On the issue of whether language is best seen as having evolved as an adaptation or as a spandrel, evolutionary biologist W. Tecumseh Fitch, following Stephen J. Gould, argues that it is unwarranted to assume that every aspect of language is an adaptation, or that language as a whole is an adaptation. He criticizes some strands of evolutionary psychology for suggesting a pan-adaptionist view of evolution, and dismisses Pinker and Bloom's question of whether "Language has evolved as an adaptation" as being misleading. He argues instead that from a biological viewpoint the evolutionary origins of language is best conceptualized as being the probable result of a convergence of many separate adaptations into a complex system. A similar argument is made by Terrence Deacon who in The Symbolic Species argues that the different features of language have co-evolved with the evolution of the mind and that the ability to use symbolic communication is integrated in all other cognitive processes.

If the theory that language could have evolved as a single adaptation is accepted, the question becomes which of its many functions has been the basis of adaptation. Several evolutionary hypotheses have been posited: that language evolved for the purpose of social grooming, that it evolved as a way to show mating potential or that it evolved to form social contracts. Evolutionary psychologists recognize that these theories are all speculative and that much more evidence is required to understand how language might have been selectively adapted.

Mating

Given that sexual reproduction is the means by which genes are propagated into future generations, sexual selection plays a large role in human evolution. Human mating, then, is of interest to evolutionary psychologists who aim to investigate evolved mechanisms to attract and secure mates. Several lines of research have stemmed from this interest, such as studies of mate selection mate poaching, mate retention, mating preferences and conflict between the sexes.

In 1972 Robert Trivers published an influential paper on sex differences that is now referred to as parental investment theory. The size differences of gametes (anisogamy) is the fundamental, defining difference between males (small gametes – sperm) and females (large gametes – ova). Trivers noted that anisogamy typically results in different levels of parental investment between the sexes, with females initially investing more. Trivers proposed that this difference in parental investment leads to the sexual selection of different reproductive strategies between the sexes and to sexual conflict. For example, he suggested that the sex that invests less in offspring will generally compete for access to the higher-investing sex to increase their inclusive fitness. Trivers posited that differential parental investment led to the evolution of sexual dimorphisms in mate choice, intra- and inter- sexual reproductive competition, and courtship displays. In mammals, including humans, females make a much larger parental investment than males (i.e. gestation followed by childbirth and lactation). Parental investment theory is a branch of life history theory.

Buss and Schmitt's (1993) Sexual Strategies Theory proposed that, due to differential parental investment, humans have evolved sexually dimorphic adaptations related to "sexual accessibility, fertility assessment, commitment seeking and avoidance, immediate and enduring resource procurement, paternity certainty, assessment of mate value, and parental investment." Their Strategic Interference Theory suggested that conflict between the sexes occurs when the preferred reproductive strategies of one sex interfere with those of the other sex, resulting in the activation of emotional responses such as anger or jealousy.

Women are generally more selective when choosing mates, especially under long-term mating conditions. However, under some circumstances, short term mating can provide benefits to women as well, such as fertility insurance, trading up to better genes, reducing the risk of inbreeding, and insurance protection of her offspring.

Due to male paternity uncertainty, sex differences have been found in the domains of sexual jealousy. Females generally react more adversely to emotional infidelity and males will react more to sexual infidelity. This particular pattern is predicted because the costs involved in mating for each sex are distinct. Women, on average, should prefer a mate who can offer resources (e.g., financial, commitment), thus, a woman risks losing such resources with a mate who commits emotional infidelity. Men, on the other hand, are never certain of the genetic paternity of their children because they do not bear the offspring themselves. This suggests that for men sexual infidelity would generally be more aversive than emotional infidelity because investing resources in another man's offspring does not lead to the propagation of their own genes.

Another interesting line of research is that which examines women's mate preferences across the ovulatory cycle. The theoretical underpinning of this research is that ancestral women would have evolved mechanisms to select mates with certain traits depending on their hormonal status. Known as the ovulatory shift hypothesis, the theory posits that, during the ovulatory phase of a woman's cycle (approximately days 10–15 of a woman's cycle), a woman who mated with a male with high genetic quality would have been more likely, on average, to produce and bear a healthy offspring than a woman who mated with a male with low genetic quality. These putative preferences are predicted to be especially apparent for short-term mating domains because a potential male mate would only be offering genes to a potential offspring. This hypothesis allows researchers to examine whether women select mates who have characteristics that indicate high genetic quality during the high fertility phase of their ovulatory cycles. Indeed, studies have shown that women's preferences vary across the ovulatory cycle. In particular, Haselton and Miller (2006) showed that highly fertile women prefer creative but poor men as short-term mates. Creativity may be a proxy for good genes. Research by Gangestad et al. (2004) indicates that highly fertile women prefer men who display social presence and intrasexual competition; these traits may act as cues that would help women predict which men may have, or would be able to acquire, resources.

Parenting

Reproduction is always costly for women, and can also be for men. Individuals are limited in the degree to which they can devote time and resources to producing and raising their young, and such expenditure may also be detrimental to their future condition, survival and further reproductive output.
Parental investment is any parental expenditure (time, energy etc.) that benefits one offspring at a cost to parents' ability to invest in other components of fitness (Clutton-Brock 1991: 9; Trivers 1972). Components of fitness (Beatty 1992) include the well-being of existing offspring, parents' future reproduction, and inclusive fitness through aid to kin (Hamilton, 1964). Parental investment theory is a branch of life history theory.

The benefits of parental investment to the offspring are large and are associated with the effects on condition, growth, survival, and ultimately, on the reproductive success of the offspring. However, these benefits can come at the cost of the parent's ability to reproduce in the future e.g. through the increased risk of injury when defending offspring against predators, the loss of mating opportunities whilst rearing offspring, and an increase in the time to the next reproduction. Overall, parents are selected to maximize the difference between the benefits and the costs, and parental care will likely evolve when the benefits exceed the costs.

The Cinderella effect is an alleged high incidence of stepchildren being physically, emotionally or sexually abused, neglected, murdered, or otherwise mistreated at the hands of their stepparents at significantly higher rates than their genetic counterparts. It takes its name from the fairy tale character Cinderella, who in the story was cruelly mistreated by her stepmother and stepsisters. Daly and Wilson (1996) noted: "Evolutionary thinking led to the discovery of the most important risk factor for child homicide – the presence of a stepparent. Parental efforts and investments are valuable resources, and selection favors those parental psyches that allocate effort effectively to promote fitness. The adaptive problems that challenge parental decision-making include both the accurate identification of one's offspring and the allocation of one's resources among them with sensitivity to their needs and abilities to convert parental investment into fitness increments…. Stepchildren were seldom or never so valuable to one's expected fitness as one's own offspring would be, and those parental psyches that were easily parasitized by just any appealing youngster must always have incurred a selective disadvantage"(Daly & Wilson, 1996, pp. 64–65). However, they note that not all stepparents will "want" to abuse their partner's children, or that genetic parenthood is any insurance against abuse. They see step parental care as primarily "mating effort" towards the genetic parent.

Family and kin

Inclusive fitness is the sum of an organism's classical fitness (how many of its own offspring it produces and supports) and the number of equivalents of its own offspring it can add to the population by supporting others. The first component is called classical fitness by Hamilton (1964).

From the gene's point of view, evolutionary success ultimately depends on leaving behind the maximum number of copies of itself in the population. Until 1964, it was generally believed that genes only achieved this by causing the individual to leave the maximum number of viable offspring. However, in 1964 W. D. Hamilton proved mathematically that, because close relatives of an organism share some identical genes, a gene can also increase its evolutionary success by promoting the reproduction and survival of these related or otherwise similar individuals. Hamilton concluded that this leads natural selection to favor organisms that would behave in ways that maximize their inclusive fitness. It is also true that natural selection favors behavior that maximizes personal fitness.

Hamilton's rule describes mathematically whether or not a gene for altruistic behavior will spread in a population:

where
  is the reproductive cost to the altruist,
  is the reproductive benefit to the recipient of the altruistic behavior, and
  is the probability, above the population average, of the individuals sharing an altruistic gene – commonly viewed as "degree of relatedness".

The concept serves to explain how natural selection can perpetuate altruism. If there is an "altruism gene" (or complex of genes) that influences an organism's behavior to be helpful and protective of relatives and their offspring, this behavior also increases the proportion of the altruism gene in the population, because relatives are likely to share genes with the altruist due to common descent. Altruists may also have some way to recognize altruistic behavior in unrelated individuals and be inclined to support them. As Dawkins points out in The Selfish Gene (Chapter 6) and The Extended Phenotype, this must be distinguished from the green-beard effect.

Although it is generally true that humans tend to be more altruistic toward their kin than toward non-kin, the relevant proximate mechanisms that mediate this cooperation have been debated (see kin recognition), with some arguing that kin status is determined primarily via social and cultural factors (such as co-residence, maternal association of sibs, etc.), while others have argued that kin recognition can also be mediated by biological factors such as facial resemblance and immunogenetic similarity of the major histocompatibility complex (MHC). For a discussion of the interaction of these social and biological kin recognition factors see Lieberman, Tooby, and Cosmides (2007) (PDF).

Whatever the proximate mechanisms of kin recognition there is substantial evidence that humans act generally more altruistically to close genetic kin compared to genetic non-kin.

Interactions with non-kin / reciprocity
Although interactions with non-kin are generally less altruistic compared to those with kin, cooperation can be maintained with non-kin via mutually beneficial reciprocity as was proposed by Robert Trivers. If there are repeated encounters between the same two players in an evolutionary game in which each of them can choose either to "cooperate" or "defect," then a strategy of mutual cooperation may be favored even if it pays each player, in the short term, to defect when the other cooperates. Direct reciprocity can lead to the evolution of cooperation only if the probability, w, of another encounter between the same two individuals exceeds the cost-to-benefit ratio of the altruistic act:
 w > c/b

Reciprocity can also be indirect if information about previous interactions is shared. Reputation allows evolution of cooperation by indirect reciprocity. Natural selection favors strategies that base the decision to help on the reputation of the recipient: studies show that people who are more helpful are more likely to receive help. The calculations of indirect reciprocity are complicated and only a tiny fraction of this universe has been uncovered, but again a simple rule has emerged. Indirect reciprocity can only promote cooperation if the probability, q, of knowing someone's reputation exceeds the cost-to-benefit ratio of the altruistic act:
 q > c/b

One important problem with this explanation is that individuals may be able to evolve the capacity to obscure their reputation, reducing the probability, q, that it will be known.

Trivers argues that friendship and various social emotions evolved in order to manage reciprocity. Liking and disliking, he says, evolved to help present-day humans' ancestors form coalitions with others who reciprocated and to exclude those who did not reciprocate. Moral indignation may have evolved to prevent one's altruism from being exploited by cheaters, and gratitude may have motivated present-day humans' ancestors to reciprocate appropriately after benefiting from others' altruism. Likewise, present-day humans feel guilty when they fail to reciprocate. These social motivations match what evolutionary psychologists expect to see in adaptations that evolved to maximize the benefits and minimize the drawbacks of reciprocity.

Evolutionary psychologists say that humans have psychological adaptations that evolved specifically to help us identify nonreciprocators, commonly referred to as "cheaters." In 1993, Robert Frank and his associates found that participants in a prisoner's dilemma scenario were often able to predict whether their partners would "cheat," based on a half-hour of unstructured social interaction. In a 1996 experiment, for example, Linda Mealey and her colleagues found that people were better at remembering the faces of people when those faces were associated with stories about those individuals cheating (such as embezzling money from a church).

Strong reciprocity (or "tribal reciprocity")

Humans may have an evolved set of psychological adaptations that predispose them to be more cooperative than otherwise would be expected with members of their tribal in-group, and, more nasty to members of tribal out groups. These adaptations may have been a consequence of tribal warfare. Humans may also have predispositions for "altruistic punishment" – to punish in-group members who violate in-group rules, even when this altruistic behavior cannot be justified in terms of helping those you are related to (kin selection), cooperating with those who you will interact with again (direct reciprocity), or cooperating to better your reputation with others (indirect reciprocity).

Evolutionary psychology and culture

Though evolutionary psychology has traditionally focused on individual-level behaviors, determined by species-typical psychological adaptations, considerable work has been done on how these adaptations shape and, ultimately govern, culture (Tooby and Cosmides, 1989). Tooby and Cosmides (1989) argued that the mind consists of many domain-specific psychological adaptations, some of which may constrain what cultural material is learned or taught. As opposed to a domain-general cultural acquisition program, where an individual passively receives culturally-transmitted material from the group, Tooby and Cosmides (1989), among others, argue that: "the psyche evolved to generate adaptive rather than repetitive behavior, and hence critically analyzes the behavior of those surrounding it in highly structured and patterned ways, to be used as a rich (but by no means the only) source of information out of which to construct a 'private culture' or individually tailored adaptive system; in consequence, this system may or may not mirror the behavior of others in any given respect." (Tooby and Cosmides 1989).

Biological explanations of human culture also brought criticism to evolutionary psychology: Evolutionary psychologists see the human psyche and physiology as a genetic product and assume that genes contain the information for the development and control of the organism and that this information is transmitted from one generation to the next via genes. Evolutionary psychologists thereby see physical and psychological characteristics of humans as genetically programmed. Even then, when evolutionary psychologists acknowledge the influence of the environment on human development, they understand the environment only as an activator or trigger for the programmed developmental instructions encoded in genes. Evolutionary psychologists, for example, believe that the human brain is made up of innate modules, each of which is specialised only for very specific tasks, e. g. an anxiety module. According to evolutionary psychologists, these modules are given before the organism actually develops and are then activated by some environmental event. Critics object that this view is reductionist and that cognitive specialisation only comes about through the interaction of humans with their real environment, rather than the environment of distant ancestors. Interdisciplinary approaches are increasingly striving to mediate between these opposing points of view and to highlight that biological and cultural causes need not be antithetical in explaining human behaviour and even complex cultural achievements.

In psychology sub-fields

Developmental psychology

According to Paul Baltes, the benefits granted by evolutionary selection decrease with age. Natural selection has not eliminated many harmful conditions and nonadaptive characteristics that appear among older adults, such as Alzheimer disease. If it were a disease that killed 20-year-olds instead of 70-year-olds this may have been a disease that natural selection could have eliminated ages ago. Thus, unaided by evolutionary pressures against nonadaptive conditions, modern humans suffer the aches, pains, and infirmities of aging and as the benefits of evolutionary selection decrease with age, the need for modern technological mediums against non-adaptive conditions increases.

Social psychology
As humans are a highly social species, there are many adaptive problems associated with navigating the social world (e.g., maintaining allies, managing status hierarchies, interacting with outgroup members, coordinating social activities, collective decision-making). Researchers in the emerging field of evolutionary social psychology have made many discoveries pertaining to topics traditionally studied by social psychologists, including person perception, social cognition, attitudes, altruism, emotions, group dynamics, leadership, motivation, prejudice, intergroup relations, and cross-cultural differences.

When endeavouring to solve a problem humans at an early age show determination while chimpanzees have no comparable facial expression. Researchers suspect the human determined expression evolved because when a human is determinedly working on a problem other people will frequently help.

Abnormal psychology

Adaptationist hypotheses regarding the etiology of psychological disorders are often based on analogies between physiological and psychological dysfunctions, as noted in the table below. Prominent theorists and evolutionary psychiatrists include Michael T. McGuire, Anthony Stevens, and Randolph M. Nesse. They, and others, suggest that mental disorders are due to the interactive effects of both nature and nurture, and often have multiple contributing causes.

Evolutionary psychologists have suggested that schizophrenia and bipolar disorder may reflect a side-effect of genes with fitness benefits, such as increased creativity. (Some individuals with bipolar disorder are especially creative during their manic phases and the close relatives of people with schizophrenia have been found to be more likely to have creative professions.) A 1994 report by the American Psychiatry Association found that people with schizophrenia at roughly the same rate in Western and non-Western cultures, and in industrialized and pastoral societies, suggesting that schizophrenia is not a disease of civilization nor an arbitrary social invention. Sociopathy may represent an evolutionarily stable strategy, by which a small number of people who cheat on social contracts benefit in a society consisting mostly of non-sociopaths. Mild depression may be an adaptive response to withdraw from, and re-evaluate, situations that have led to disadvantageous outcomes (the "analytical rumination hypothesis") (see Evolutionary approaches to depression).

Some of these speculations have yet to be developed into fully testable hypotheses, and a great deal of research is required to confirm their validity.

Antisocial and criminal behavior

Evolutionary psychology has been applied to explain criminal or otherwise immoral behavior as being adaptive or related to adaptive behaviors. Males are generally more aggressive than females, who are more selective of their partners because of the far greater effort they have to contribute to pregnancy and child-rearing. Males being more aggressive is hypothesized to stem from the more intense reproductive competition faced by them. Males of low status may be especially vulnerable to being childless. It may have been evolutionary advantageous to engage in highly risky and violently aggressive behavior to increase their status and therefore reproductive success. This may explain why males are generally involved in more crimes, and why low status and being unmarried are associated with criminality. Furthermore, competition over females is argued to have been particularly intensive in late adolescence and young adulthood, which is theorized to explain why crime rates are particularly high during this period. Some sociologists have underlined differential exposure to androgens as the cause of these behaviors, notably Lee Ellis in his evolutionary neuroandrogenic (ENA) theory.

Many conflicts that result in harm and death involve status, reputation, and seemingly trivial insults. Steven Pinker in his book The Better Angels of Our Nature argues that in non-state societies without a police it was very important to have a credible deterrence against aggression. Therefore, it was important to be perceived as having a credible reputation for retaliation, resulting in humans developing instincts for revenge as well as for protecting reputation ("honor"). Pinker argues that the development of the state and the police have dramatically reduced the level of violence compared to the ancestral environment. Whenever the state breaks down, which can be very locally such as in poor areas of a city, humans again organize in groups for protection and aggression and concepts such as violent revenge and protecting honor again become extremely important.

Rape is theorized to be a reproductive strategy that facilitates the propagation of the rapist's progeny. Such a strategy may be adopted by men who otherwise are unlikely to be appealing to women and therefore cannot form legitimate relationships, or by high-status men on socially vulnerable women who are unlikely to retaliate to increase their reproductive success even further. The sociobiological theories of rape are highly controversial, as traditional theories typically do not consider rape to be a behavioral adaptation, and objections to this theory are made on ethical, religious, political, as well as scientific grounds.

Psychology of religion

Adaptationist perspectives on religious belief suggest that, like all behavior, religious behaviors are a product of the human brain. As with all other organ functions, cognition's functional structure has been argued to have a genetic foundation, and is therefore subject to the effects of natural selection and sexual selection. Like other organs and tissues, this functional structure should be universally shared amongst humans and should have solved important problems of survival and reproduction in ancestral environments. However, evolutionary psychologists remain divided on whether religious belief is more likely a consequence of evolved psychological adaptations, or a byproduct of other cognitive adaptations.

Coalitional psychology
Coalitional psychology is an approach to explain political behaviors between different coalitions and the conditionality of these behaviors in evolutionary psychological perspective. This approach assumes that since human beings appeared on the earth, they have evolved to live in groups instead of living as individuals to achieve benefits such as more mating opportunities and increased status. Human beings thus naturally think and act in a way that manages and negotiates group dynamics.

Coalitional psychology offers falsifiable ex ante prediction by positing five hypotheses on how these psychological adaptations operate:
 Humans represent groups as a special category of individual, unstable and with a short shadow of the future
 Political entrepreneurs strategically manipulate the coalitional environment, often appealing to emotional devices such as "outrage" to inspire collective action.
 Relative gains dominate relations with enemies, whereas absolute gains characterize relations with allies.
 Coalitional size and male physical strength will positively predict individual support for aggressive foreign policies.
 Individuals with children, particularly women, will vary in adopting aggressive foreign policies than those without progeny.

Reception and criticism

Critics of evolutionary psychology accuse it of promoting genetic determinism, pan-adaptationism (the idea that all behaviors and anatomical features are adaptations), unfalsifiable hypotheses, distal or ultimate explanations of behavior when proximate explanations are superior, and malevolent political or moral ideas.

Ethical implications
Critics have argued that evolutionary psychology might be used to justify existing social hierarchies and reactionary policies. It has also been suggested by critics that evolutionary psychologists' theories and interpretations of empirical data rely heavily on ideological assumptions about race and gender.

In response to such criticism, evolutionary psychologists often caution against committing the naturalistic fallacy – the assumption that "what is natural" is necessarily a moral good. However, their caution against committing the naturalistic fallacy has been criticized as means to stifle legitimate ethical discussions.

Contradictions in models
Some criticisms of evolutionary psychology point at contradictions between different aspects of adaptive scenarios posited by evolutionary psychology. One example is the evolutionary psychology model of extended social groups selecting for modern human brains, a contradiction being that the synaptic function of modern human brains require high amounts of many specific essential nutrients so that such a transition to higher requirements of the same essential nutrients being shared by all individuals in a population would decrease the possibility of forming large groups due to bottleneck foods with rare essential nutrients capping group sizes. It is mentioned that some insects have societies with different ranks for each individual and that monkeys remain socially functioning after the removal of most of the brain as additional arguments against big brains promoting social networking. The model of males as both providers and protectors is criticized for the impossibility of being in two places at once, the male cannot both protect his family at home and be out hunting at the same time. In the case of the claim that a provider male could buy protection service for his family from other males by bartering food that he had hunted, critics point at the fact that the most valuable food (the food that contained the rarest essential nutrients) would be different in different ecologies and as such vegetable in some geographical areas and animal in others, making it impossible for hunting styles relying on physical strength or risk-taking to be universally of similar value in bartered food and instead of making it inevitable that in some parts of Africa, food gathered with no need for major physical strength would be the most valuable to barter for protection. A contradiction between evolutionary psychology's claim of men needing to be more sexually visual than women for fast speed of assessing women's fertility than women needed to be able to assess the male's genes and its claim of male sexual jealousy guarding against infidelity is also pointed at, as it would be pointless for a male to be fast to assess female fertility if he needed to assess the risk of there being a jealous male mate and in that case his chances of defeating him before mating anyway (pointlessness of assessing one necessary condition faster than another necessary condition can possibly be assessed).

Standard social science model

Evolutionary psychology has been entangled in the larger philosophical and social science controversies related to the debate on nature versus nurture. Evolutionary psychologists typically contrast evolutionary psychology with what they call the standard social science model (SSSM). They characterize the SSSM as the "blank slate", "relativist", "social constructionist", and "cultural determinist" perspective that they say dominated the social sciences throughout the 20th century and assumed that the mind was shaped almost entirely by culture.

Critics have argued that evolutionary psychologists created a false dichotomy between their own view and the caricature of the SSSM. Other critics regard the SSSM as a rhetorical device or a straw man and suggest that the scientists whom evolutionary psychologists associate with the SSSM did not believe that the mind was a blank state devoid of any natural predispositions.

Reductionism and determinism
Some critics view evolutionary psychology as a form of genetic reductionism and genetic determinism, a common critique being that evolutionary psychology does not address the complexity of individual development and experience and fails to explain the influence of genes on behavior in individual cases. Evolutionary psychologists respond that they are working within a nature-nurture interactionist framework that acknowledges that many psychological adaptations are facultative (sensitive to environmental variations during individual development). The discipline is generally not focused on proximate analyses of behavior, but rather its focus is on the study of distal/ultimate causality (the evolution of psychological adaptations). The field of behavioral genetics is focused on the study of the proximate influence of genes on behavior.

Testability of hypotheses

A frequent critique of the discipline is that the hypotheses of evolutionary psychology are frequently arbitrary and difficult or impossible to adequately test, thus questioning its status as an actual scientific discipline, for example because many current traits probably evolved to serve different functions than they do now. Thus because there are a potentially infinite number of alternative explanations for why a trait evolved, critics contend that it is impossible to determine the exact explanation. While evolutionary psychology hypotheses are difficult to test, evolutionary psychologists assert that it is not impossible. Part of the critique of the scientific base of evolutionary psychology includes a critique of the concept of the Environment of Evolutionary Adaptation (EEA). Some critics have argued that researchers know so little about the environment in which Homo sapiens evolved that explaining specific traits as an adaption to that environment becomes highly speculative. Evolutionary psychologists respond that they do know many things about this environment, including the facts that present day humans' ancestors were hunter-gatherers, that they generally lived in small tribes, etc. Edward Hagen argues that the human past environments were not radically different in the same sense as the Carboniferous or Jurassic periods and that the animal and plant taxa of the era were similar to those of the modern world, as was the geology and ecology. Hagen argues that few would deny that other organs evolved in the EEA (for example, lungs evolving in an oxygen rich atmosphere) yet critics question whether or not the brain's EEA is truly knowable, which he argues constitutes selective scepticism. Hagen also argues that most evolutionary psychology research is based on the fact that females can get pregnant and males cannot, which Hagen observes was also true in the EEA.

John Alcock describes this as the "No Time Machine Argument", as critics are arguing that since it is not possible to travel back in time to the EEA, then it cannot be determined what was going on there and thus what was adaptive. Alcock argues that present-day evidence allows researchers to be reasonably confident about the conditions of the EEA and that the fact that so many human behaviours are adaptive in the current environment is evidence that the ancestral environment of humans had much in common with the present one, as these behaviours would have evolved in the ancestral environment. Thus Alcock concludes that researchers can make predictions on the adaptive value of traits. Similarly, Dominic Murphy argues that alternative explanations cannot just be forwarded but instead need their own evidence and predictions - if one explanation makes predictions that the others cannot, it is reasonable to have confidence in that explanation. In addition, Murphy argues that other historical sciences also make predictions about modern phenomena to come up with explanations about past phenomena, for example, cosmologists look for evidence for what we would expect to see in the modern-day if the Big Bang was true, while geologists make predictions about modern phenomena to determine if an asteroid wiped out the dinosaurs. Murphy argues that if other historical disciplines can conduct tests without a time machine, then the onus is on the critics to show why evolutionary psychology is untestable if other historical disciplines are not, as "methods should be judged across the board, not singled out for ridicule in one context."

Modularity of mind

Evolutionary psychologists generally presume that, like the body, the mind is made up of many evolved modular adaptations, although there is some disagreement within the discipline regarding the degree of general plasticity, or "generality," of some modules. It has been suggested that modularity evolves because, compared to non-modular networks, it would have conferred an advantage in terms of fitness and because connection costs are lower.

In contrast, some academics argue that it is unnecessary to posit the existence of highly domain specific modules, and, suggest that the neural anatomy of the brain supports a model based on more domain general faculties and processes. Moreover, empirical support for the domain-specific theory stems almost entirely from performance on variations of the Wason selection task which is extremely limited in scope as it only tests one subtype of deductive reasoning.

Cultural rather than genetic development of cognitive tools
Psychologist Cecilia Heyes has argued that the picture presented by some evolutionary psychology of the human mind as a collection of cognitive instinctsorgans of thought shaped by genetic evolution over very long time periodsdoes not fit research results. She posits instead that humans have cognitive gadgets"special-purpose organs of thought" built in the course of development through social interaction. Similar criticisms are articulated by Subrena E. Smith of the University of New Hampshire.

Response by evolutionary psychologists
Evolutionary psychologists have addressed many of their critics (e.g. in books by Segerstråle (2000), Barkow (2005), and Alcock (2001)). Among their rebuttals are that some criticisms are straw men, or are based on an incorrect nature versus nurture dichotomy or on basic misunderstandings of the discipline. 

Robert Kurzban suggested that "...critics of the field, when they err, are not slightly missing the mark. Their confusion is deep and profound. It's not like they are marksmen who can't quite hit the center of the target; they're holding the gun backwards." Many have written specifically to correct basic misconceptions.

See also

 Affective neuroscience
 Behavioural genetics
 Biocultural evolution
 Biosocial criminology
 Collective unconscious
 Cognitive neuroscience
 Cultural neuroscience
 Darwinian Happiness
 Darwinian literary studies
 Deep social mind
 Dunbar's number
 Evolution of the brain
 List of evolutionary psychologists
 Evolutionary origin of religions
 Evolutionary psychology and culture
 Molecular evolution
 Primate cognition
 Hominid intelligence
 Human ethology
 Great ape language
 Chimpanzee intelligence
 Cooperative eye hypothesis
 Id, ego, and superego
 Intersubjectivity
 Mirror neuron
 Noogenesis
 Origin of language
 Origin of speech
 Ovulatory shift hypothesis
 Primate empathy
 Shadow (psychology)
 Simulation theory of empathy
 Theory of mind
 Neuroethology
 Paleolithic diet
 Paleolithic lifestyle
 r/K selection theory
 Social neuroscience
 Sociobiology
 Universal Darwinism

Notes

References

 
 Barkow, J., Cosmides, L. & Tooby, J. 1992. The adapted mind: Evolutionary psychology and the generation of culture. Oxford: Oxford University Press.
 
 
 
 
 
 Buss, D. M. (1994). The evolution of desire: Strategies of human mating. New York: Basic Books.
 
 
 
 Confer, Easton, Fleischman, Goetz, Lewis, Perilloux & Buss Evolutionary Psychology , American Psychologist, 2010.
 
 Durrant, R., & Ellis, B.J. (2003). Evolutionary Psychology. In M. Gallagher & R.J. Nelson (Eds.), Comprehensive Handbook of Psychology, Volume Three: Biological Psychology (pp. 1–33). New York: Wiley & Sons.
 
 Gaulin, Steven J. C. and Donald H. McBurney. Evolutionary psychology. Prentice Hall. 2003. 
 
 
 

</ref>

 Nesse, R.M. (2000). Tingergen's Four Questions Organized.
 
 
 
 
 
 
 Schacter, Daniel L, Daniel Wegner and Daniel Gilbert. 2007. Psychology. Worth Publishers.  .
 
 Tooby, J. & Cosmides, L. (2005). Conceptual foundations of evolutionary psychology. In D. M. Buss (Ed.), The Handbook of Evolutionary Psychology (pp. 5–67). Hoboken, NJ: Wiley. Full text

Further reading

 
 
 
 Heylighen F. (2012). "Evolutionary Psychology", in: A. Michalos (ed.): Encyclopedia of Quality of Life Research (Springer, Berlin).
 
 
 Gerhard Medicus (2015). Being Human – Bridging the Gap between the Sciences of Body and Mind. Berlin: VWB 
 Oikkonen, Venla: Gender, Sexuality and Reproduction in Evolutionary Narratives. London: Routledge, 2013.

External links

 PsychTable.org Collaborative effort to catalog human psychological adaptations
 
 What Is Evolutionary Psychology? by Clinical Evolutionary Psychologist Dale Glaebach.
 Evolutionary Psychology – Approaches in Psychology

Academic societies
 Human Behavior and Evolution Society; international society dedicated to using evolutionary theory to study human nature
 The International Society for Human Ethology; promotes ethological perspectives on the study of humans worldwide
 European Human Behaviour and Evolution Association an interdisciplinary society that supports the activities of European researchers with an interest in evolutionary accounts of human cognition, behavior and society
 The Association for Politics and the Life Sciences; an international and interdisciplinary association of scholars, scientists, and policymakers concerned with evolutionary, genetic, and ecological knowledge and its bearing on political behavior, public policy and ethics.
 Society for Evolutionary Analysis in Law a scholarly association dedicated to fostering interdisciplinary exploration of issues at the intersection of law, biology, and evolutionary theory
 The New England Institute for Cognitive Science and Evolutionary Psychology aims to foster research and education into the interdisciplinary nexus of cognitive science and evolutionary studies
 The NorthEastern Evolutionary Psychology Society; regional society dedicated to encouraging scholarship and dialogue on the topic of evolutionary psychology
 Feminist Evolutionary Psychology Society researchers that investigate the active role that females have had in human evolution

Journals
 Evolutionary Psychology –  free access online scientific journal
 Evolution and Human Behavior – journal of the Human Behavior and Evolution Society
 Evolutionary Psychological Science - An international, interdisciplinary forum for original research papers that address evolved psychology. Spans social and life sciences, anthropology, philosophy, criminology, law and the humanities.
 Politics and the Life Sciences – an interdisciplinary peer-reviewed journal published by the Association for Politics and the Life Sciences
 Human Nature: An Interdisciplinary Biosocial Perspective – advances the interdisciplinary investigation of the biological, social, and environmental factors that underlie human behavior. It focuses primarily on the functional unity in which these factors are continuously and mutually interactive. These include the evolutionary, biological, and sociological processes as they interact with human social behavior.
 Biological Theory: Integrating Development, Evolution and Cognition – devoted to theoretical advances in the fields of biology and cognition, with an emphasis on the conceptual integration afforded by evolutionary and developmental approaches.
 Evolutionary Anthropology
 Behavioral and Brain Sciences – interdisciplinary articles in psychology, neuroscience, behavioral biology, cognitive science, artificial intelligence, linguistics and philosophy. About 30% of the articles have focused on evolutionary analyses of behavior.
 Evolution and Development – research relevant to interface of evolutionary and developmental biology
 The Evolutionary Review – Art, Science, and Culture

Videos
 Brief video clip from the "Evolution" PBS Series
 TED talk  by Steven Pinker about his book The Blank Slate: The Modern Denial of Human Nature
 RSA talk by evolutionary psychologist Robert Kurzban on modularity of mind, based on his book Why Everyone (Else) is a Hypocrite
 Richard Dawkins' lecture on natural selection and evolutionary psychology
 Evolutionary Psychology – Steven Pinker & Frans de Waal Audio recording
 Stone Age Minds: A conversation with evolutionary psychologists Leda Cosmides and John Tooby
 Margaret Mead and Samoa. Review of the nature versus nurture debate triggered by Mead's book "Coming of Age in Samoa."
 "Evolutionary Psychology", In Our Time, BBC Radio 4 discussion with Janet Radcliffe Richards, Nicholas Humphrey and Steven Rose (November 2, 2000)

 
psychology